The Thailand roundleaf bat (Hipposideros halophyllus) is a species of bat in the family Hipposideridae. It is endemic to Thailand.

Distribution
Hipposideros halophyllus is found in:
Khao Samor Khon, Lopburi Province (1,000-1,400 individuals)
Pha Daeng Cave, Chiang Mai Province (fewer than 200 individuals)
Khao Singto, Sa Kaeo Province (fewer than 200 individuals)
Ton Chan Cave, Saraburi Province
Khao Yoi Cave, Phetchaburi Province

References

Mammals of Thailand
Hipposideros
Mammals described in 1984
Bats of Southeast Asia
Taxonomy articles created by Polbot